Indirect parliamentary elections were held in Guinea-Bissau on 31 March 1984. At the time, the country was a one-party state with the African Party for the Independence of Guinea and Cape Verde as the sole legal party. The Assembly elected João Bernardo Vieira to the post of President on 16 May 1984.

Electoral system
Voters elected regional councillors, who in turn elected members of the National People's Assembly.

References

1984 elections in Africa
1984 in Guinea-Bissau
1984
One-party elections
1984
March 1984 events in Africa